The 2006 Monza Superbike World Championship round was the fourth round of the 2006 Superbike World Championship. It took place on the weekend of May 5–7, 2006 at Monza.

Results

Superbike race 1 classification

Superbike race 2 classification

Supersport race classification

References
 Superbike Race 1
 Superbike Race 2
 Supersport Race

Monza Round
Monza Superbike